Magunta Parvathi Subramma Reddy (commonly known as Magunta Parvathamma) (born 1947) is an Indian National Congress politician from Andhra Pradesh. She was a member of the 11th Lok Sabha and won the 2004 Andhra Pradesh Legislative Assembly election.

Early life
Magunta was born on 27 July 1947 in Buchireddypalem of Nellore district to Bezawada Rama Reddy and his wife. She did her schooling from Kasturi Devi Girls School.

Career
For the 1996 Indian general election, the Indian National Congress (INC) made Parvathamma its candidate from Ongole. She obtained 3,81,475 votes while her nearest rival Mekapati Rajamohan Reddy of Telugu Desam Party (TDP) received 3,31,415. After winning the seat she became a member of the 11th Lok Sabha. During the 2004 Andhra Pradesh Legislative Assembly election, she won from Kavali securing 57.68% of the total votes polled. Parvathamma was one of the contestants for the Ongole assembly seat during the 2012 Andhra Pradesh by-election. She is a director of the Pearl Distillery.

Personal life
She married politician Magunta Subbarama Reddy on 19 February 1967. Together they had two children. Reddy was shot dead by members of the People's War Group in 1995.

References

1947 births
Living people
India MPs 1996–1997
Lok Sabha members from Andhra Pradesh
Women members of the Lok Sabha
Andhra Pradesh MLAs 2004–2009
Women members of the Andhra Pradesh Legislative Assembly
People from Nellore district
Indian National Congress politicians from Andhra Pradesh
21st-century Indian women politicians